Dubailand is an entertainment complex being built in Dubai, United Arab Emirates, which is owned by Tatweer (which belongs to Dubai Holding). When announced in 2003 it was one of the most ambitious leisure developments ever proposed anywhere in the world costing $64.3 billion, but development has been severely impacted by global recession and Dubai's financial crisis. The development was put on hold in 2008 but resumed in mid-2013. Updates in 2013 show that $55 billion has been raised towards the works.

Development

Dubailand was announced on 23 October 2003. To date, there are currently 22 projects under construction. Dubailand is divided into six zones (worlds): Attractions and Experience World, Sports and Outdoor World, Eco-Tourism World, Themed Leisure and Vacation World, Retail and Entertainment World, and Downtown. It will be twice the size of Walt Disney World Resort, and will be the largest collection of theme parks in the world; however, no theme park in Dubailand will surpass Disney's Animal Kingdom (located at Walt Disney World Resort) as the world's largest theme park.

The Sahara Kingdom theme park, situated in the Attractions & Experience World, will cover  and will combine high end virtual and physical theme park rides, attractions such as a state of the art gaming zone, IMAX theater, and integrated live and virtual entertainment shows, together with a retail zone, four hotels and residential accommodations. The theme of the development is traditional Arabian folklore and the tales of One Thousand and One Nights.

In 2006, planning permission was granted for the Great Dubai Wheel, a  giant Ferris wheel with 30 passenger capsules, to be built and managed by the Great Wheel Corporation. It was expected to open in 2009, at a cost of over AED 250 million. In January 2012 it was announced that the Great Dubai Wheel would not be built.

In 2008, most of the developments in Dubailand were put on hold and virtually all of the staff and workforce were fired due to global financial meltdown of the late 2007-2008.

DreamWorks announced plans, on 19 January 2008 to build a theme park in Dubailand.

On 4 March 2008, Tatweer announced a strategic alliance with Six Flags to build the  Six Flags Dubailand theme park.

On 1 May 2008, Tatweer announced the launch of Freej Dubailand. Freej Dubailand will boast hotels totalling 2,600 keys, and feature retail, food and beverage outlets, as well as a spectrum of entertainment attractions.

On 2 May 2008, it was announced that the design and conceptual master plan for a Marvel Superheroes theme park had been finalized, the first of its kind. It will include 17 rides and attractions on a  development.

On 6 May 2008, Tatweer announced a strategic alliance with Merlin Entertainments Group to build a Legoland park in Dubailand.

At this point, Dubai Properties Group took over Dubailand from Tatweer. United States companies Six Flags and DreamWorks dropped out of their projects, losing interest in the site.

In September 2012, Dubai Properties Group announced the revival of the Mudon residential community project, estimating the completion of the project at around 18 months.

Construction on the site resumed in early 2013, with the 72,000 square-meter Dubai Miracle Gardens opening at the beginning of March. The adjacent 2,600 square-meter Dubai Butterfly Garden opened in 2015.

In October 2016, Legoland Dubai was opened at Dubai Parks and Resorts, 35 km from Dubailand. In December 2016, Motiongate Dubai, which incorporates DreamWorks' attractions, opened at Dubai Parks and Resorts.

Zones
This list includes both places that have been built and opened and proposed places that have not yet been built.
Attractions & Experience World
Akoya Oxygen 
Bawadi
Fantasia
Falconcity of Wonders
IMG Worlds of Adventure 
Legends of Dubailand
Global Village
The Trump World Golf Club, Dubai (opened in 2017)
Kids City
Retail and Entertainment World
Dubai Outlet City
Black Market
Flea Market
World Trade Park
Auction World
Factory Outlets
Dubai Lifestyle City
Themed Leisure and Vacation World
Women's World (LEMNOS)
Destination Dubai
Desert Kingdom
Andalusian Resort and Spa
Eco-Tourism World
Al Sahra Desert Resort
Sand Dune Hotel
Al Kaheel
Bio World
Animal World
Sports and Outdoor World
Dubai Sports City
Emerat Sports World
Extreme Sports World
Plantation Equestrian and Polo Club
Dubai Motor City which includes Dubai Autodrome
Dubai Golf City
Dubai Snowdome
Downtown
City of Arabia
Mall of Arabia, which will be the world's largest shopping mall
Restless Planet
Wadi Walk
Elite Towers
City Walk
Virtual Game World

Cancelled projects
Legoland Dubailand (moved to phase 1 of Dubai Parks & Resorts in Jebel Ali as Legoland Dubai, opened October 2016)
Six Flags Dubailand (moved to phase 2 of Dubai Parks & Resorts in Jebel Ali as Six Flags Dubai, but subsequently cancelled)
Pharaohs Theme Park
DreamWorks Studio Theme Park (now as a part of Motiongate Dubai in Dubai Parks & Resorts, opened October 2016)
Universal Studios Dubailand
F1-X Theme Park Dubai
The Tiger Woods Dubai (renamed as "The Trump World Golf Club, Dubai" as part of Akoya Oxygen, opened 2017)
Brownstown Dubailand and Rowleyville Dubailand
Freej Dubailand
Marvel Superheroes Theme Park (now as a part of IMG Worlds of Adventure, opened 15 August 2016)
Tourism world
Aviation World
Islamic culture and Science World
Giants World
Six Water Parks
Astrolab Resort
Great Dubai Wheel

See also

List of development projects in Dubai

References

External links
 Dubailand website
 Tatweer website
 Dubai Holding website
 The Dubai Lands Website
 Meraas Development is the majority shareholder of Dubai Parks and Resorts (52%)

 
2003 establishments in the United Arab Emirates
Government-owned companies of the United Arab Emirates
Tourist attractions in Dubai